Quantitative analysis may refer to:

 Quantitative research, application of mathematics and statistics in economics and marketing
 Quantitative analysis (chemistry), the determination of the absolute or relative abundance of one or more substances present in a sample
 Quantitative analysis (finance), the use of mathematical and statistical methods in finance and investment management
 Quantitative analysis of behavior, quantitative models in the experimental analysis of behavior
 Mathematical psychology, an approach to psychological research using mathematical modeling of perceptual, cognitive and motor processes
 Statistics, the collection, organization, analysis, interpretation and presentation of data

See also
 QA (disambiguation)